The Mini Europa is an annual international figure skating competition, which is held in the spring in Warsaw, Poland. It was first organised in the year of 2004. Initially dedicated to the youngest age categories, it was gradually gaining older and older competitors, ending up with the Juniors in the May 2013. Medals may be awarded in the disciplines of men's singles and ladies' singles.

Junior medalists

Men

Ladies

Novice medalists

Men

Ladies

Juvenile medalists
In the beginning the competition was organised only for the children categories and having evolved from the Polish European Criterium series event, it was divided into deriving from it categories of Debs (the oldest) – Springs – Cubs – Chicks (the youngest) (some of them occasionally divided into sub-categories according to years of birth).

However, starting with May 2014, they were changed into more common Gold (the oldest) – Silver – Bronze (the youngest), and continue so until contemporary times.

Detailful information on the medals and results is available on the result pages of the Polish Figure Skating Association.

Sources
 Mini Europa 2019
 Mini Europa 2018
 Mini Europa 2017
 Mini Europa 2016
 Mini Europa 2015
 Mini Europa 2014
 Mini Europa 2013
 Mini Europa 2012
 Mini Europa 2011
 Mini Europa 2010
 Mini Europa 2009
 Mini Europa 2007

External links 
 Polish Figure Skating Association

International figure skating competitions hosted by Poland
Sports competitions in Warsaw
Spring (season) events in Poland